Thienaba Arrondissement  is an arrondissement of the Thiès Department in the Thiès Region of Senegal.

Subdivisions
The arrondissement is divided administratively into rural communities and in turn into villages.

Arrondissements of Senegal
Thiès Region